Chaosdorf is a hackspace operated by non-profit association (Eingetragener Verein) Chaos Computer Club Düsseldorf / Chaosdorf e.V. in the city of Düsseldorf, Germany. It is Düsseldorf’s Chaos Computer Club chapter.

The association 
Chaosdorf is operated by non-profit association Chaos Computer Club Düsseldorf / Chaosdorf e.V. and is mainly financed by member fees and donations. A membership in the association is not required to take part in the mostly cost-free workshops and meetings.

The purpose of the association is the creation of an environment for adult education, modern information privacy and socializing between communities.

History

Founding 
Chaosdorf was founded 24 April 2001. Their first rooms were located on Fürstenwall 232 in Düsseldorf-Friedrichstadt.

Second hackspace 

After a lengthy renovation process Chaosdorf moved into a new building on Hüttenstrasse that used to be a "rather sketchy nightclub" in 2011.

The space itself consists of four rooms: A large lounge/hackcenter, a kitchen, a media room, and a workshop. Chaosdorf owns different kinds of equipment to help members fulfilling their projects and offering services.

Nationwide awareness 

Chaosdorf is known in the German hackspace culture for organizing Easterhegg 2002 – the first Easterhegg event outside of Hamburg – and OpenChaos: Hackerspace Design Patterns.

It gained mainstream attention in 2013 for organizing a large-scale street protest in Cologne demanding net neutrality after Deutsche Telekom announced to throttle web traffic.

Chaosdorf gained even more widespread mainstream attention after Der Spiegel published a story about its non-commercial in-house OwnBeer microbrewery.

On 30 December 2013 Rheinische Post, a major German regional daily newspaper, published a two page feature about Chaosdorf.

The hackspace also supports friendly organizations such as Forum Freies Theater, Free Software Foundation Europe, Freifunk Rheinland e.V., and Sub-Etha by providing room for meetings, storage for hardware, or infrastructure.

International awareness 
In October 2013 members of the technology online magazine Hack a Day published a story about Chaosdorf – their first visit in a German hackspace.

New hackspace "Chaosdorf 4.0" 
In 2020 Chaosdorf moved to a bigger building on Sonnenstrasse. The new space provides the following rooms: class room, electronic lab, wet lab, hackcenter, kitchen/lounge, and fab lab (Werkstatt).

Renowned members 
Among the members of Chaosdorf are a few renowned people such as former member of parliament North Rhine-Westphalia Marc Olejak of the Pirate Party Germany, visual artist Rachid Maazouz and the security researchers Ilias Morad, Alexander Karl, and Martin Dessauer.

External links

References 

Hackerspaces
Computer clubs in Germany
Non-profit organisations based in North Rhine-Westphalia
Education in Düsseldorf
Culture in Düsseldorf
Organisations based in Düsseldorf